The Balboa 20 is an American trailerable sailboat that was designed by Lyle C. Hess as a cruiser, at the request of Richard Arthur and first built in 1967.

The success of the Balboa 20 allowed Hess to become a sailboat designer on a full-time basis.

The Balboa 20 hull design was used for two 1972 raised deck boats, the Ensenada 20 and the RK 20.

Production
The design was built by Arthur Marine and Coastal Recreation, Inc in the United States,  starting in 1967, but it is now out of production.

Design
The design goals for the boat were low cost and good seaworthiness.

The Balboa 20 is a recreational keelboat, built predominantly of fiberglass, with wood trim. It has a fractional sloop rig, a spooned raked stem, an angled transom, with a lazarette, a transom-hung rudder controlled by a tiller and a lifting keel. It displaces  and carries  of cast iron ballast.

The boat is normally fitted with a small  outboard motor for docking and maneuvering.

The design has sleeping accommodation for four people, with a double "V"-berth in the bow cabin and two quarter berths in the main cabin. The galley is located on the starboard side just forward of the companionway ladder. The head is located under the bow cabin berth.

Operational history
In 1977 it was reported that the designer's personal boat was a Balboa 20, named Genesis.

In a 2010 review Steve Henkel wrote, "Lyle Hess’s designs are usually thought to be prettier (or handsomer?) than most, but in this early design it is hard to see a clear distinction from many other trailer-sailers of the era. Worst features: The cast iron swing keel, weighing more than a quarter of the total boat and controlled by a winch in the cabin, is at best a maintenance headache and at worst could cause serious leakage in the hull due to strain."

See also
List of sailing boat types

Related development
Balboa 16
Balboa 21
Balboa 22
Balboa 23
Balboa 24
Ensenada 20
RK 20

References

Keelboats
1960s sailboat type designs
Sailing yachts
Trailer sailers
Sailboat type designs by Lyle Hess
Sailboat types built by Arthur Marine
Sailboat types built by Coastal Recreation, Inc